William Montana Mann (1886–1960) was an American entomologist and the fifth director of the National Zoo in Washington, D.C. from 1925 until 1956. In 1921, he traveled on the Mulford Expedition to the Amazon. In 1926, he married Lucile Quarry Mann. The two worked together as a team to improve and promote the zoo, including going on expeditions around the world to collect live specimens for the zoo's collection.  He graduated from Washington State University and Harvard University.

Legacy
Mann is commemorated in the scientific names of four species and subspecies of reptiles: Amphisbaena manni, Lepidodactylus manni, Letheobia manni, Lygodactylus manni and Rhinoclemmys pulcherrima manni. Mann is also honored in the specific name of the fish 
Gambusia manni.

Publications
Mann, W. M. 1912. Parabiosis in Brazilian ants. Psyche (Camb.) 19: 36-41 [1912-IV]
Mann, W. M. 1915. A new form of a southern ant from Naushon Island, Massachusetts. Psyche (Camb.) 22: 51
Mann, W. M. 1916. The Stanford Expedition to Brazil, 1911, John C. Branner, Director. The ants of Brazil. Bull. Mus. Comp. Zool. 60: 399-490
Mann, W. M. 1919. The ants of the British Solomon Islands. Bull. Mus. Comp. Zool. 63: 273-391
Mann, W. M. 1920b. Additions to the ant fauna of the West Indies and Central America. Bull. Am. Mus. Nat. Hist. 42: 403-439
Mann, W. M. 1921. The ants of the Fiji Islands. Bull. Mus. Comp. Zool. 64: 401-499
Mann, W. M. 1922. Ants from Honduras and Guatemala. Proc. U. S. Natl. Mus. 61: 1-54
Mann, W. M. 1923. Two new ants from Bolivia. (Results of the Mulford Biological Exploration. - Entomology.). Psyche (Camb.) 30: 13-18
Mann, W. M. 1924a. Notes on Cuban ants. Psyche (Camb.) 31: 19-23
Mann, W. M. 1925a. New beetle guests of army ants. J. Wash. Acad. Sci. 15: 73-77
Mann, W. M. 1925b. Ants collected by the University of Iowa Fiji-New Zealand Expedition. Stud. Nat. Hist. Iowa Univ. 11(4 4: 5-6
Mann, W. M. 1926. Some new neotropical ants. Psyche (Camb.) 33: 97-107
Mann, W. M. 1929. Notes on Cuban ants of the genus Macromischa (Hymenoptera: Formicidae). Proc. Entomol. Soc. Wash. 31: 161-166
Mann, W. M. 1931. A new ant from Porto Rico. J. Wash. Acad. Sci. 21: 440-441
Mann, W. M. 1935. Two new ants collected in quarantine. Psyche (Camb.) 42: 35-37
Mann, W. M. 1950. Ant Hill Odyssey, Little, Brown and Company, Boston
Wheeler, W. M.; Mann, W. M. 1914. The ants of Haiti. Bull. Am. Mus. Nat. Hist. 33: 1-61
Wheeler, W. M.; Mann, W. M. 1916. The ants of the Phillips Expedition to Palestine during 1914. Bull. Mus. Comp. Zool. 60: 167-174
Wheeler, W. M.; Mann, W. M. 1942a. [Untitled. Pseudomyrma picta Stitz var. heterogyna Wheeler and Mann, var. nov.]. pp. 172–173 in: Wheeler, W. M. Studies of Neotropical ant-plants and their ants. Bull. Mus. Comp. Zool. 90:1-262.
Wheeler, W. M.; Mann, W. M. 1942b. [Untitled. Pseudomyrma triplarina (Weddell) var. rurrenabaquensis Wheeler & Mann, var. nov.]. pp. 188–189 in: Wheeler, W. M. Studies of Neotropical ant-plants and their ants. Bull. Mus. Comp. Zool. 90:1-262.
Wheeler, W. M.; Mann, W. M. 1942c. [Untitled. Allomerus decemarticulatus Mayr subsp. novemarticulatus Wheeler & Mann, subsp. nov.]. P. 199 in: Wheeler, W. M. Studies of Neotropical ant-plants and their ants. Bull. Mus. Comp. Zool. 90:1-262.
Wheeler, W. M.; Mann, W. M. 1942g. [Untitled. Azteca brevicornis Mayr var. boliviana Wheeler & Mann, var. nov.]. P. 225 in: Wheeler, W. M. Studies of Neotropical ant-plants and their ants. Bull. Mus. Comp. Zool. 90:1-262.
Wheeler, W. M.; Mann, W. M. 1942h. [Untitled. Azteca ulei Forel var. gagatina Wheeler and Mann var. nov.]. P. 246 in: Wheeler, W. M. Studies of Neotropical ant-plants and their ants. Bull. Mus. Comp. Zool. 90:1-262.
Wheeler, W. M.; Mann, W. M. 1942i. [Untitled. Myrmelachista (Decamera) schumanni Emery var. cordincola Wheeler & Mann, var. nov.]. P. 255 in: Wheeler, W. M. Studies of Neotropical ant-plants and their ants. Bull. Mus. Comp. Zool. 90:1-262.

References

External links

American entomologists
Zoo directors
1886 births
1960 deaths
Washington State University alumni
Harvard University alumni
20th-century American zoologists